Josy Mosar (16 September 1927–13 August 2022) was a Luxembourgian footballer. He played in 16 matches for the Luxembourg national football team from 1952 to 1960. He was also part of Luxembourg's team for their qualification matches for the 1954 FIFA World Cup.

References

External links
 

1927 births
2022 deaths
Luxembourgian footballers
Luxembourg international footballers
People from Mamer
Association footballers not categorized by position